Methyl pentanoate, commonly known as methyl valerate, is the methyl ester of pentanoic acid (valeric acid) with a fruity odor. 

Methyl pentanoate is commonly used in fragrances, beauty care, soap, laundry detergents at levels of 0.1–1%. 

In a very pure form (greater than 99.5%) it is used as a plasticizer in the manufacture of plastics. 

It is also used as an insecticide.

See also 
 Ethyl pentanoate

References 

Methyl esters
Valerate esters